Joseph Burns may refer to:
Joseph Burns (baseball) (1889–1987), MLB outfielder for the Detroit Tigers
Joseph Burns (murderer) (c. 1806–1848), New Zealand murderer
Joseph Burns (Northern Ireland politician) (born 1906), Ulster Unionist politician, represented North Londonderry, 1958–1972
Joseph Burns (U.S. politician) (1800–1875), U.S. Representative from Ohio
Joseph A. Burns, astronomy professor
Joseph F. Burns, member of the California legislature
Joe Burns (American football) (born 1979), NFL running back for the Buffalo Bills
Joe Burns (catcher) (1900–1986), MLB catcher for the Chicago White Sox
Joe Burns (cricketer) (born 1989), Australian cricketer
Joe Burns (infielder) (1916–1974), MLB infielder for the Philadelphia Athletics

See also
Joseph Burn (1871–1950), actuary
Joseph Byrne (disambiguation)